Sometimes the Blues Is Just a Passing Bird is an EP by Swedish musician The Tallest Man on Earth. It was released on 6 September 2010 by Dead Oceans.

It marks one of Kristian Matsson's first incorporations of electric guitar sound, on "The Dreamer". "Like the Wheel" appears as a bonus track on his 2010 album The Wild Hunt, rewritten to include nothing but piano and vocals.

Track listing

Charts

References 

2010 EPs
The Tallest Man on Earth albums
Dead Oceans albums